HP-GL, short for Hewlett-Packard Graphics Language and often written as HPGL, is a printer control language created by Hewlett-Packard (HP). HP-GL was the primary printer control language used by HP plotters. It was introduced with the plotter HP-8972 in 1977 and became a standard for almost all plotters. Hewlett-Packard's printers also usually support HP-GL/2 in addition to PCL.

Design 
The language is formed from a series of two letter codes (mnemonics), followed by optional parameters. For instance an arc can be drawn on a page by sending the string:

AA100,100,50;

This means Arc Absolute, and the parameters place the center of the arc at absolute coordinates 100,100 on the page, with a starting angle of 50 degrees measured counter-clockwise. A fourth optional parameter (not used here) specifies how far the arc continues, and defaults to 5 degrees.

When first introduced, HP-GL contained the following commands:

Formats:
 [i]: integer formats between -32767 and 32768.  No decimal point.
 [d]: decimal format between +/- 127.9999.  Optional decimal point.
 [c]: ASCII character

Examples 
Typical HP-GL files start with a few setup commands, followed by a long string of graphics commands. The file was in ASCII (text file) format, for instance:

The coordinate system was based on the smallest units one of the HP plotters could support, and was set to 25 µm (i.e. 40 units per millimeter, 1016 per inch).
The coordinate space was positive or negative floating point numbers, specifically ±230.

HP-GL/2 
The original HP-GL language did not support definition of line width, as this parameter was determined by the pens loaded into the plotter. With the advent of the first inkjet plotters, line width for the "pens" specified within the HP-GL files had to be set at the printer so it would know what line width to print for each pen, a cumbersome and error-prone process. With Hewlett-Packard Graphics Language/2 aka HP-GL/2, definition of line width was introduced into the language and allowed for elimination of this step. Also, among other improvements a binary file format was defined that allowed for smaller files and shorter file transfer times, and the minimal resolution was reduced.

AGL 
HP-GL is related to AGL (A Graphics Language), an extension of the BASIC programming language. AGL was implemented on Hewlett-Packard minicomputers to simplify controlling a plotter. AGL commands describe the desired graphics plotting function, which the computer relays as several HP-GL instructions to the plotter.

See also 
 DMPL, another plotter language by Houston Instruments
 Gerber format is another plot-description format
 ShareCAD, a free online HP-GL/PLT viewer
 Logo, a computer language with drawing commands similar to HP-GL

References

Further reading

External links 
 
 
  (NB. A Python-based HP-GL plotter control library for using vintage pen plotters with contemporary operating systems.)

HP software
Vector graphics
Page description languages